A Taste of Catnip is a 1966 Warner Bros. Merrie Melodies cartoon directed by Robert McKimson. The short was released on December 3, 1966, and stars Daffy Duck and Speedy Gonzales with cameos by Sylvester the Cat and Hector the Bulldog (named ’’Butch’’ here). It was the final overall theatrical classic-era Warner Brothers cartoon featuring Sylvester and Hector during the golden age of American animation.

Plot
At the Guadalajara Medical Centre, psychiatrist Dr. Manuel Jose Olvera Sebastian Rudolfo Ortiz Pancho Jimenez Perez III (Mexico's finest) describes an encounter one year ago with Daffy Duck. Daffy proceeds to tell Perez that he has been exhibiting progressively more extreme cat-like desires.

Perez discovers through a blood test that Daffy has lethal amounts of catnip in his blood, and he must discover the source. Daffy discovers that right across the street is the Continental Catnip Corp. of Chihuahua. He decides to destroy it with a rocket, ridding him of his cat-like desires but also arousing the rage of neighborhood cats, including Sylvester. Perez receives a phone call about Daffy's success, and his next patient, Speedy Gonzales, enters; he exhibits duck-like desires. Moaning, Perez claims, "Oh, I should have listened to mi padre. He wanted me to be a bandido."

See also
 List of Daffy Duck cartoons

References

External links
 

Merrie Melodies short films
Warner Bros. Cartoons animated short films
1966 animated films
1966 short films
1966 films
Films directed by Robert McKimson
Daffy Duck films
Speedy Gonzales films
Sylvester the Cat films
1960s Warner Bros. animated short films
1960s English-language films